Collective Sigh is the debut album by Pinkwash released on Don Giovanni Records in 2016.

Track listing
 "No Real Witness"
 "Longer Now"
 "Metastatic"
 "Gumdrop"
 "The Brevity Is Unkind"
 "Burning Too"
 "Sigh"
 "Space Dust"
 "Halfmoon"
 "Walk Forward With My Eyes Closed"

References

Don Giovanni Records albums
2016 albums